The Shanghai Television Festival, abbreviated STVF, also known as the Shanghai International Television Festival is the first and one of the largest television festivals in East Asia. Held since 1986, STVF has become one of the most influential and prestigious international television festivals in Asia, strengthening the cooperation and communication between the Chinese media industry and the world.

The festival is also home to the annual Magnolia Awards. Awards are handed out to both international and national productions through voting by a panel  of award-winning actors, producers, directors and writers, and are the highest industry honours given. It is considered to be one of the most prestigious television awards, alongside the Feitian Awards and Golden Eagle Awards. Since 2004, the Magnolia Awards have been held every year.

History
In 1986, with the commission of the Shanghai People's Congress, the film festival opened with entries from 16 countries. There were no awards presented. 
In 1988, the film festival created the Magnolia Awards, named after the floral emblem of Shanghai. It awarded Best Actor, Best Actress, Best Documentary and Best Director. Until 2004, it has held an awards ceremony every 2 years. 
In 1990, the categories of Best Animation and Special Jury Award were included. The latter was discontinued in 2007.
In 2004, the Magnolia Awards became an annual ceremony.
In 2008, the concept of Gold and Silver Awards were introduced in several categories so more quality productions could gain recognition. This was discontinued in 2015.
In 2009, public voting for a variety of popularity awards were included. These awards have not been given out annually, and were officially discontinued in 2015.
A new category awarding variety shows was created in 2015.

Awards Categories

Television Series
 Best Television Series
 Best Actor
 Best Actress
 Best Director
 Best Writer
 Best Supporting Actor (since 2015)
 Best Supporting Actress (since 2015)
 Best Foreign Television Series
 Best Foreign Television Miniseries

Variety
 Best Seasonal Variety Show
 Best Variety Show
 Best Face on Variety Show

Documentary
 Best Serial Documentary
 Best Documentary

Animation
 Best Animation
 Best Animation Script

Defunct categories
 Most Popular Director
 Most Popular Actor
 Most Popular Actress
 Most Popular New Actor
 Most Popular New Actress
 Best Television Film or Miniseries Gold and Silver Awards
 Best Directing for a Television Film
 Best Writing for a Television Film
 Best Actor in a Television Film 
 Best Actress in a Television Film
 Best Chinese Animation
 Best Foreign Animation
 Best Asian Documentary
 Best Natural Documentary
 Best Society Documentary
 Best Director for a Documentary 
 Best Cinematography for a Documentary

See also

List of Asian television awards

References

External links
Shanghai Television Festival official site 
IMDb entry
Chinaculture.org 
Britfilms
8th Annual 
10th Annual 
11th Annual 
12th Annual 
14th Annual 
16th Annual 

 
Recurring events established in 1986
Chinese television awards
1986 establishments in China